In mathematics, a Lucas chain is a restricted type of addition chain, named for the French mathematician Édouard Lucas. It is a sequence 

a0, a1, a2, a3, ...

that satisfies

a0=1, 

and 
for each k > 0: ak = ai + aj, and either ai = aj or  |ai − aj| = am, for some i, j, m < k.

The sequence of powers of 2 (1, 2, 4, 8, 16, ...) and the Fibonacci sequence (with a slight adjustment of the starting point 1, 2, 3, 5, 8, ...) are simple examples of Lucas chains.

Lucas chains were introduced by Peter Montgomery in 1983.  If L(n) is the length of the shortest Lucas chain for n, then Kutz has shown that most n do not have L < (1-ε) logφ n, where φ is the Golden ratio.

References 

 
 
 

Integer sequences
Addition chains